CHIB was a volunteer-run radio station in Chibougamau, Quebec, Canada, located at CFS Chibougamau, a military radar installation that formed part of the Pine Tree Line.

References

Chibougamau
Hib
Hib
Radio stations established in 1963
Radio stations disestablished in 1984
1963 establishments in Quebec
1984 disestablishments in Quebec
HIB